Vivian Brown (December 17, 1941 – August 20, 1998) was an American sprinter. She competed in the women's 200 metres at the 1964 Summer Olympics. She won first place in the women's 200 meters at the 1963 Pan American Games.

References

External links
 

1941 births
1998 deaths
Athletes (track and field) at the 1964 Summer Olympics
American female sprinters
Olympic track and field athletes of the United States
Athletes (track and field) at the 1963 Pan American Games
Pan American Games gold medalists for the United States
Pan American Games medalists in athletics (track and field)
Track and field athletes from Detroit
Tennessee State Lady Tigers track and field athletes
Medalists at the 1963 Pan American Games
20th-century American women
Olympic female sprinters